Cliff Evans may refer to:

 Clif Evans (born 1948), politician in Manitoba, Canada
 Clifford R. Evans, Canadian trade unionist and UFCW leader
 Cliff Evans (artist), American artist of Australian origin
 Cliff Evans (rugby league), Welsh rugby league footballer and coach
 Cliff Evans, a character in the short story "Cipher in the Snow"